1259 Ógyalla, provisional designation , is a Themistian asteroid from the outer region of the asteroid belt, approximately 32 kilometers in diameter. It was discovered on 29 January 1933, by German astronomer Karl Reinmuth at Heidelberg Observatory in southwest Germany. The asteroid was named for the Hurbanovo Observatory.

Orbit and classification 

Ógyalla is a member of the Themis family, the 9th largest main-belt asteroid family of nearly 5,000 asteroids with nearly coplanar ecliptical orbits. It orbits the Sun in the outer main-belt at a distance of 2.7–3.5 AU once every 5 years and 6 months (1,997 days). Its orbit has an eccentricity of 0.13 and an inclination of 2° with respect to the ecliptic.

Physical characteristics

Rotation period 

A rotational lightcurve of Ógyalla was obtained by the Spanish Photometric Asteroid Analysis Group (OBAS) in June 2016. Light curve analysis gave a well-defined rotation period of 17.334 hours with a brightness variation of 0.41 magnitude. In September 2012, photometric observations at the Palomar Transient Factory gave a period of 17.2669 and 17.3038 hours with an amplitude of 0.27 and 0.25 in the R- and S-band, respectively.

The first lightcurve was already obtained in 1974, by Swedish astronomer Claes-Ingvar Lagerkvist at Uppsala Observatory from photographic photometry, but it was only fragmentary and gave a tentative period of 12 hours.

Diameter and albedo 

According to the surveys carried out by the Infrared Astronomical Satellite IRAS, the Japanese Akari satellite, and NASA's Wide-field Infrared Survey Explorer with its subsequent NEOWISE mission, Ógyalla measures between 26.59 and 36.11 kilometers in diameter, and its surface has an albedo between 0.064 and 0.10 (without preliminary results). The Collaborative Asteroid Lightcurve Link (CALL) derives an albedo of 0.0916 and a diameter of 33.31 kilometers based on an absolute magnitude of 10.6. CALL also classifies it as a stony S-type asteroid (as it does with all Themistians).

Naming 

This minor planet was named for the Hurbanovo Observatory (IAU code: 551; formerly known as O'Gyalla Observatory), a seismological, meteorological and astronomical observatory in the former Hungarian city of Ógyalla. Since 1948, the city belongs to Slovakia and is now known as Hurbanovo. The official naming citation was mentioned in The Names of the Minor Planets by Paul Herget in 1955.

References

External links 
 Asteroid Lightcurve Database (LCDB), query form (info )
 Dictionary of Minor Planet Names, Google books
 Asteroids and comets rotation curves, CdR – Observatoire de Genève, Raoul Behrend
 Discovery Circumstances: Numbered Minor Planets (1)-(5000) – Minor Planet Center
 
 

001259
Discoveries by Karl Wilhelm Reinmuth
Named minor planets
19330129